Comanche (endonym ) is a Uto-Aztecan language spoken by the Comanche people, who split from the Shoshone people soon after the Comanche had acquired horses around 1705. The Comanche language and the Shoshoni language are therefore quite similar, but certain consonant changes in Comanche have inhibited mutual intelligibility.

The name Comanche comes from the Ute word  meaning 'enemy, stranger'.

Use and revitalization efforts 
Although efforts are now being made to ensure its survival, most speakers of the language are elderly. In the late 19th century, Comanche children were placed in boarding schools where they were discouraged from speaking their native language, and even severely punished for doing so.  The second generation then grew up speaking English, because of the belief that it was better for them not to know Comanche.

The Comanche language was briefly prominent during World War II. A group of seventeen young men referred to as the Comanche Code Talkers were trained and used by the U.S. Army to send messages conveying sensitive information in the Comanche language so that it could not be deciphered by the enemy.

As of July 2013, there were roughly 25-30 native speakers of the language, according to The Boston Globe. The Comanche Language and Cultural Preservation Committee  offers dictionaries and language learning materials. Comanche language courses were available at the now-closed Comanche Nation College. The college previously conducted a language recording project, as the language is "mostly oral," and emphasizing instruction for tribal members.

Phonology

Vowels 
Comanche has a typical Numic vowel inventory of six vowels. In addition, there is the common diphthong . In the following chart, the basic symbols given are in the IPA, whereas the equivalent symbols in the conventional orthography are given to the right of them.

Vowel length and voicing
Comanche distinguishes vowels by length. Vowels can be either long or short. Long vowels are never devoiced and in the orthography they are represented as (aa, ee, ii, oo, uu, ʉʉ). An example of a long vowel is the (ee) in [wakaréʔeː] meaning 'turtle'. Short vowels can be lengthened when they are stressed.

Short vowels can be either voiced or voiceless.  Unstressed short vowels are usually devoiced when /s/ or /h/ follows and optionally when word-final. voiceless vowels are non-phonemic and therefore not represented in this chart. In the conventional orthography, these vowels are marked with an underline: .

Consonants 
Comanche has a typical Numic consonant inventory. As with the vowel charts, the basic symbols given in this chart are in the IPA, whereas the equivalent symbols in the conventional orthography are given to the right of them.

Stress 
Comanche stress most commonly falls on the first syllable. Exceptions to this rule, such as in the words Waʔsáasiʔ, meaning 'Osage people', and aná, meaning 'ouch!', are marked with an acute accent.

For the purpose of stress placement, the diphthongs /ai/, /oi/, and /ui/ act as one vowel with one mora. Additionally, possessive pronouns, which serve as proclitics, do not affect the stress of a word (so that nʉ + námi 'my sister' retains its stress on the /a/ in námi).

Secondary stress is placed on the second syllable of a two-syllable word, the third syllable of a word with three, four, or five syllables, and the fourth syllable of a word with six syllables.

Primary stress: Primary stress is "marked when it is non-initial stress". In addition, "when a pronoun is suffixed by, for instance a postposition, the pronoun does take primary – and initial – stress." An example is [nɨpía] nʉ-pia, which means my mother (my-mother). In the following data where primary stress appears it will be shown as an "acute accent." Primary stress is found in words or compounds of three, six and five syllables. However, when primary stress is marked in a third syllable it can also be consider as a secondary stress according to Canonge's but an "exception to this case is when both a proclitic and prefix are used." An example of a third syllable stress is [há.bi+hu.píː.tu] which means 'stopped and lay down'. Words with "five syllables have primary stress on the first syllable."  An example is [ká.wo+nò.ka.tu] which means 'stress'. Also, words with six syllables have primary stress on the first syllable.  An example is [kú.ʔi.na.kù.ʔe.tu]  which means 'rosts for'.

Non-initial stress: Non-initial stress can be found in any syllable of a word that is not in the initial position and it can also fall on long vowel. Also, the "initial syllable never weakens to the point of voicelessness." However, some exceptions to the non-initial stress are animal and plant names because some of them end with a stress long vowel plus which is represented by "ʔ". "Loans are common sources of words with nonitinal stress" an example is [pirísiː] pitísii, which means 'policeman'. A word with two stresses is [ánikúra] ánikúta, which means ant (analysis unknown).

Alternating stress: Alternating stress occurs when there are words with three four, five and six syllables. In addition alternating stress is given "when nouns of compound are coequal, a root or stem has one-syllable suffix." Also, prefixes or not stem-changes do not receive an indicial stress because the alternating stress "begins on the second syllable as in the following word of six syllables, following the pattern of   five-syllable words." An example is [wu.hká.ʔa.mí.ʔanu] which means 'went to cut down'. An examples of alternating stress in a four, five and six syllabuses are [á.ni.múi ]'housefly', [yú.pu.sí.a] meaning 'louse' and [wuh+tú.pu káʔ 'buckle] which meaning 'button'. A examples of three syllables is [wáhkát ìmat òʔiàt I] waha=-?? twelve, which means 'two-??'.

Stress shift: Stress shift occurs when "verves often exhibit stylistic stress shift when occurring at the end of a breathing group." In addition, stress moves "one syllable to the right if that syllable is voiced; otherwise it skips over the voiceless vowels to the next syllable". An example is [pohínu ]'jumped. According to Charney stress shift is caused by a suffixes-n which cause a 'right ward shift of stress in form with the shape CVHCV or CVhV." Examples of CVHCV is [marohtíkʷan] ma-toH-tíkwa-n which means 'he hit him' and an example of CVhv is [pahín] pahi-n which means 'he fell'.
By using the form CVHCV or CVhV we can see that -h "is presented as a second or a precipitated consonant". However, "stress does not shift rightwards when the verb root does not contain [h]. An example is  [nómiʔan] no-miʔa-n meaning 'they moved camp.'

Phonological processes 
 Free Variation: although not often reflected in the orthography, certain sounds occur in free variation. In contemporary times, preaspiration and preglottalization may occur in free variation with a long vowel: aakaaʔ / ahkaaʔ ('devil's horn').
 Spirantization: spirantization can occur in the phonemes  and  when they are preceded by vowels.  becomes the voiced bilabial fricative, usually written as a b, and  becomes the voiced alveolar tap, written as an r. An intervening  or  does not block this spirantization process, as seen in tuaʔbaʔa 'on the son' (the sound  is written here as b, and is allophonic with the Comanche ). In the past, there was a process of nasalization in Comanche which has since been lost and which blocked spirantization; certain words that would otherwise exhibit spirantization in modern Comanche do not, therefore, as a result of the historical presence of what would have been a preceding nasal (ʉ papi 'your head' would historically have been ʉn papi).
 Metathesis: A fairly regular process of metathesis occurs, sporadically with voiceless consonants and regularly with voiced consonants. It is accompanied by the deletion of a vowel: otʉnhʉh > orʉhʉ > ohrʉ ('they', dual). In modern Comanche, voiceless, unaspirated stops followed by a long  (written ʉ) and an  may be realized as aspirated equivalents at the expense of the subsequent long vowel and : pitsipʉ̱ha > pitsipʰa ('milk').
It is usually written with an h before the consonant, as in aworahna 'cupboard' or ekasahpanaʔ 'soldier'. Similarly, many of the same consonants can also undergo preglottalization, which is written with ʔ before the consonant (resulting in the digraphs ʔn, ʔb, ʔw, and ʔr), as in hunuʔbiʔ 'creek' or taʔwoʔiʔ 'gun'.
 Organic and Inorganic Devoicing: each Comanche vowel has an allophonic voiceless (or "whispered") equivalent. The devoicing process in Comanche follows a predictable pattern, and can be broken down into two categories - organic (compulsory) and inorganic (optional).
 A vowel which precedes an /s/ or an /h/ undergoes induced organic devoicing, provided that the vowel is unstressed, short, and not part of a cluster (contrast situsuʔa, 'this one also', which undergoes organic devoicing, with the similar word situusuʔa, 'these ones also', which does not because the vowel is not short). Two adjacent syllables cannot both have organic voiceless vowels. In such a situation, the second vowel does not devoice.
 The second type of devoicing that can occur in Comanche is inorganic devoicing. Short vowels that are not part of a cluster may be optionally devoiced at the end of a breath group, and this may apply even if the preceding vowel has undergone organic devoicing. Additionally, an inorganic, voiceless vowel conditions optional lengthening of a voiced penultimate vowel if there is no intervening preaspirated consonant (for example, kaasa̲ 'wing' and oomo̲ 'leg').

Writing system 
The Comanche Alphabet was developed by Dr. Alice Anderton, a linguistic anthropologist, and was adopted as the official Comanche Alphabet by the Comanche Nation in 1994. The alphabet is as follows:

 Notes:

 Long vowels are indicated by doubling the vowel: aa, ee, ii, oo, uu, ʉʉ.
 Voiceless vowels are indicated by an underline: a̱, e̱, i̱, o̱, u̱, ʉ̱.
 When the stress does not fall on the first syllable of the word, it is marked with an acute accent ´:  'coyote'.
 The glottal stop  is sometimes written as ?.

Morphology 
Like many languages of the Americas, Comanche can be classified as a polysynthetic language.

Nouns 
Comanche nouns are inflected for case and number, and the language possesses a dual number. Like many Uto-Aztecan languages, nouns may take an absolutive suffix. Many cases are also marked using postpositions.

Personal pronouns exist for three numbers (singular, dual, and plural) and three persons. They have different forms depending on whether or not they are the subject or object of a verb, possessive (including reflexive possessive forms), or the object of a postposition. Like many languages of the Americas, Comanche first-person plural pronouns have both inclusive and exclusive forms.

The Comanche paradigm for nominal number suffixes is illustrated below (in the practical orthography):

 Notes:

 The objective and possessive forms differ only in their final feature: fortis is applied at the end of the possessive suffixes.
 The two dual suffixes are not technically distinct and may be used interchangeably. However, the first of the two (Dual I) is preferred for humans.
 The absolutive suffix may be dropped before the addition of these suffixes.

Verbs 
Many of the verb stems regularly are suppletive: intransitive verbs are suppletive for singular versus plural subject and transitive verbs are suppletive for singular versus plural object.  Verbs can take various affixes, including incorporated nouns before the stem.  Most verb affixes are suffixes, except for voicing-changing prefixes and instrumental prefixes.

The verb stem can take a number of prefixes and suffixes. A sketch of all the elements that may be affixed to the verb is given on the right:

In addition to verbal affixes, Comanche verbs can also be augmented by other verbs. Although in principle Comanche verbs may be freely combined with other verbs, in actuality only a handful of verbs, termed auxiliary verbs, are frequently combined with others. These forms take the full range of aspectual suffixes. Common auxiliary verbs in Comanche include hani 'to do, make', naha 'to be, become', miʔa 'to go', and katʉ / yʉkwi 'to sit'. An example of how the verbs combine:

Instrumental prefixes

As mentioned above, Comanche has a rich repertoire of instrumental prefixes, and certain verbs (termed instrumental verbs) cannot occur without an instrumental prefix. These prefixes can affect the transitivity of a verb. The Comanche instrumental prefixes are listed below:
 kʉh- = 'with the teeth, chin, mouth'
 kuh- = 'with heat, fire'
 ma- = 'with the hand' and as a generalized instrumental
 mu- / muh = 'with the nose, lips, front'
 nih- = 'verbally'
 pih- = 'with the buttocks, rear (e.g., of a car)'
 sʉ- = 'with cold'; fortis is applied at the end of the prefix
 sʉh- = 'with the foot, in a violent motion'
 su- = 'with the mind, mental activity'; fortis is applied at the end of the prefix
 tah- = 'with the foot'
 toh- = 'with the hand, violent or completed action'
 tsah- = 'with the hand (extended to hand tools)'
 tsih- = 'with a sharp point, with the finger'
 tsoh- = 'with the head'
 wʉh- = an all-purpose instrumental

Syntax 

Comanche parts of speech include nouns, verbs, adjectives, adverbs, pronouns, and interjections (such as haa 'yes' and kee 'no'), as well as particles.

The standard word order is subject–object–verb, but it can shift in two specific circumstances. The topic of a sentence, though marked with one of two particles, is often placed at the beginning of the sentence, defying the standard word order. Furthermore, the subject of a sentence is often placed second in a sentence. When the subject is also the topic, as is often the case, it ends up in the first position, preserving SOV word order; otherwise, the subject will be placed second. For example, the English sentence 'I hit the man' could be rendered in Comanche with the components in either of the following two orders: 'I' (topic) 'man' (object) 'hit' (an aspect marker) - the standard SOV word order - or 'man' (object and topic) 'I' 'hit' (an aspect marker) - an OSV word order, which accentuates the role of the man who was hit.

Switch reference 
Like other Numic languages, Comanche has switch-reference markers to handle subordination. This refers to markers which indicate whether or not a subordinate verb has the same or different subject as the main verb, and in the case of Comanche, also the temporal relation between the two verbs.

When the verb of a subordinate clause has a different subject from the verb of the main clause, and the time of the verbs is simultaneous, the subordinate verb is marked with -ku, and its subject is marked as if it were an object. When the time of the verbs is not simultaneous, the subordinate verb is marked with one of several affixes depending on the duration of the subordinate verb and whether it refers to an action which occurred before that described by the main verb or one which occurred after.

In popular culture 
In the 1956 film The Searchers, starring John Wayne, there are several badly pronounced Comanche words interspersed, such as nawyecka ( 'move camp around') and timoway ( 'buy, trade').

In the 1963 film McLintock!, also starring John Wayne, McLintock (Wayne) and Chief Puma (Michael Pate) speak Comanche several times throughout the film.

In a 2013 Boston Globe article, linguist Todd McDaniels of Comanche Nation College commented on Johnny Depp's attempts to speak the Comanche language in the film The Lone Ranger, saying, "The words were there, the pronunciation was shaky but adequate."

In the 2016 film The Magnificent Seven two of the titular characters, a Comanche warrior named Red Harvest and Sam Chisholm, an African-American warrant officer, speak Comanche to each other.

In the 2019 TV series The Son, the main character, Eli McCullough, lives with a tribe of Comanche natives, who speak in Comanche to each other and later to him.

The 2022 movie Prey, set in the early 18th century, is the first feature film to have a full Comanche language dub.

See also

 Comanche people
 Numic languages
 Shoshoni language
 Timbisha language

Notes

Bibliography 

 Ager, Simon.  Comanche (nʉmʉ tekwapʉ). Omniglot, 1998-2013.
 Anderton, Alice. (1997). Kaawosa plays a trick on a soldier: A Comanche coyote story. In Jane Hill, P.J. Mistry, & Lyle Campbell (Eds.), The life of language: Papers in linguistics in honor of William Bright (pp. 243–255). Trends in linguistics: Studies and monographs (No. 108). Berlin: Mouton de Gruyter.
 
 
 
 
 
 
 
 
 Canonge, Elliott D. (1958). Comanche texts. Summer Institute of Linguistics publications in linguistics and related fields (No. 1). Norman, OK: Summer Institute of Linguistics of the University of Oklahoma.
 
 
 
 
 Charney, Jean Ormsbee, 1993. A Grammar of Comanche. London/Lincoln: University of Nebraska Press.
The Comanche Language and Cultural Preservation Committee, October 22, 2005.
 
 
 Rejón, Manuel García. (1864; reprint 1995). Comanche vocabulary (trilingual ed.). Gelo, Daniel J. (Ed.). Texas archaeology and ethnohistory series. Austin: University of Texas Press.

External links 
Comanche Dictionary , 2020, Comanche Nation Language Department, Comanche Nation of Oklahoma; searchable in both Comanche and English languages
Linguist List map of Comanche
Comanche Language and Cultural Preservation Committee (Nʉmʉ Tekwapʉha Nomneekatʉ)
Comanche alphabet at Omniglot.com
Comanche
Exploration of the Red River of Louisiana, in the year 1852 / by Randolph B. Marcy ; assisted by George B. McClellan. hosted by the Portal to Texas History.  See charts in the back of the book that compare the English, Comanche, and Wichita languages.

Agglutinative languages
Numic languages
Indigenous languages of the North American Plains
Native American language revitalization
Indigenous languages of Oklahoma
Comanche tribe
Subject–object–verb languages
Indigenous languages of Texas
Endangered indigenous languages of the Americas